Sophie Pflanz (March 24, 1892 – September 30, 1978), also known as Zofia Maria Pflanz-Dróbecka, was a Polish ballet dancer with the Ballets Russes from 1911 to 1917.

Early life 
Zofia Maria Pflanz was born in Warsaw, the daughter of Wincenty Wilhelm Pflanz and Janina Kazimiera Maria Kęszycka Pflanz. She trained as a dancer in Warsaw, and at the Imperial School in Petrograd.

Career 

Pflanz danced with the Ballets Russes under Sergei Diaghilev, touring in the company with Adolph Bolm, Léonide Massine, Xenia Makletzova, Valentina Kachouba, Tamara Karsavina, Enrico Cecchetti, and many others. She appeared in productions of Khovanshchina (1913), Papillons (1914), Midas (1914), Prince Igor (1914), and La Légende de Joseph (1914) in Monte Carlo, Paris, and London. On tour with the Ballets Russes in the United States, she danced in Prince Igor, Daphnis et Chloé, Nijinsky's Afternoon of a Faun (1916), Till Eulenspiegel (1916), and Cléopâtre (1917).

After her time with the Ballets Russes, Pflanz returned to Warsaw, where she continued to dance as a soloist, and was head of a ballet company that toured abroad. She taught ballet in Warsaw and later in Torún, for many years.

Personal life 
Sophie Pflanz married Stanisław Burma-Dróbecki, Diaghilev's private secretary, in London in 1911. She died in 1978, aged 86 years.

References

External links 

 Troy Kinney, "Sophie Pflanz in Cleopatre" (1917), in the Cleveland Museum of Art.
 A 1917 photograph of Sophie Pflanz, from the J. Willis Sayre Collection of THeatrical Photographs, University of Washington Libraries.

1892 births
1978 deaths
Polish ballerinas
Entertainers from Warsaw
20th-century Polish ballet dancers